The Arrone is an Italian river that flows into the Tyrrhenian Sea. Its source is Lake Bracciano. The river flows out of the lake by Anguillara Sabazia and enters the Tyrrhenian Sea near Maccarese and Fregene, localities in the commune of Fiumicino.

There is another Italian river named 'Arrone' that flows into the Tyrrhenian Sea. Its source is near Piansano.

References

Rivers of the Province of Rome
Drainage basins of the Tyrrhenian Sea
Rivers of Italy